Ernesto González can refer to:

 Ernesto González (boxer) (born 1957), a Nicaraguan boxer
 Ernesto González (footballer) (born 1990), a Mexican footballer